The Lifetime Achievement Award is a Golden Rooster Award that has been given since 2005 for an achievement that has made an outstanding contribution to cinema. There is no annual award category. From 2005, the Golden Rooster Awards and Hundred Flowers Awards take place on alternate years, but the Golden Rooster Award for Lifetime Achievement Award is still made annually.

Results
This table displays the individuals who received the Lifetime Achievement Award for their contributions to film.

External links
 艺术家于洋获金鸡奖终身成就奖 全场起立鼓掌祝贺 M1905 17 October 2010
 金鸡百花闭幕式-于蓝获金鸡奖终身成就奖 Sina.com 17 October 2009
 陈强获金鸡奖终身成就奖 陈佩斯代父领奖 163.com 13 September 2008

Lifetime Achievement Achievement Award
Lifetime achievement awards